

Biography
Abimbola Gbemi Alao is a literary scholar and author. Abimbola was born in Ibadan, Nigeria. She studied at the University of Ibadan, Nigeria, where she obtained a BA (Hon) degree in Classics in 1988 and an MA Classics in 1991. She later studied PGCE and MA in creative writing at the University of Plymouth in 2001 and 2009 respectively.

She is the author of Dear Toriola, Let's Talk About Perimenopause (2019), Trickster Tales for Telling (2016), How to Enhance Your Storytelling With Music (2016),The Legendary Weaver: New Edition, a young-adult fiction book (2003 and 2011), and The Goshen Principle: A Shelter in the Time of Storm (2010). She has also written numerous poems, short stories and plays. In 2008, her short play, 'Legal Stuff', won the BBC and Royal Court Theatre '24 Degrees' Writing Competition. In 2011–2012, she wrote a collection of fables for KidsOut World Stories; this project won the 2013 Talk Talk Digital Heroes award for the East of England. 
 
She is a children's book translator and her work includes translation of the classics: 'Hansel and Gretel', 'The Little Red Hen and the Grain of Wheat' and several other books, published by Mantra Lingua publishers.

Abimbola was a tutor at the Institute of Education, University of Plymouth, from 2003 to 2007. In 2007, she was appointed as a lecturer in creative writing at the University of St Mark & St John (MARJON), Plymouth, where she taught for 11 years. A recipient of Plymouth's 2017 Mayflower Scholarship, she started her research in the UK, where she explored the influence of psychosocial intervention for dementia. She is currently a researcher at University of Lapland, Lapin yliopisto in Finland. Her research focuses on the prevalence of Frontotemporal Dementia in BME communities in the UK, and how to raise awareness of FTD for early diagnosis.

Abimbola is a visiting lecturer and lead provider of 'StoryWeavers for Dementia', a Special Study Unit (SSU) in Medical Humanities, at the Peninsula School of Medicine and Dentistry, Plymouth. The program, developed by Abimbola, explores non-pharmacological approach to dementia care. It is offered to people who live with various forms of dementia. In 2015, Abimbola collaborated with the Alzheimer's Society to run a 12-week project with service users in memory cafes. This culminated in an anthology titled, 'Narrative Adventures from Plymouth Memory Cafes'. In January 2014, Stoke Damerel College in Plymouth participated in StoryWeavers for Dementia; the school won the Prime Minister's Dementia Friendly Award: Schools Category in May 2014.

Awards 
2022, Winner The Box Plymouth After Dark Project.

2005, BBC 'Breeze' bursary award.

2008, Royal Court Theatre '24 Degrees' Writing Competition.

Live performances
Abimbola performs Storytelling, Radio Musicals  and Poetry on stage. Her audience includes children, young adults and adults.

Bibliography

Fiction and Non-Fiction 
 Desert Haiku (2023)
 Dear Toriola, Let's Talk About Perimenopause (2019)
 Trickster Tales for Telling (2016)
 How to Enhance Your Storytelling With Music (2016)
 The Legendary Weaver: New Edition (2011)
 The Goshen Principle: A Shelter in the Time of Storm (2010)
 World Stories (2011)
 The Legendary Weaver (2003)

Translations
 Hansel and Gretel: "Hansel ati Gretel" Dual Language Yoruba translation by Abimbola Alao. (2005) Mantra Lingua.
 The little Red Hen and the Grains of Wheat: Adie Pupa Kekere ati Eso Alikama' Dual Language Yoruba translation by Abimbola Alao. (2005) Mantra Lingua.
 Floppy's Friends:  "Awon ore e Floppy" Dual Language Yoruba translation by Abimbola Alao. (2004) Mantra Lingua.
 Nita Goes to Hospital:  'Nita lo si ile iwosan' Dual Language Yoruba translation by Abimbola Alao. (2005) Mantra Lingua.
 Grandma's Saturday Soup:  'Obe Ojo Abameta Mama Agba' Dual Language Yoruba translation by Abimbola Alao. (2005) Mantra Lingua.
 Welcome to the world baby:  'Kaabo sinu aye Omo titun' Dual Language Yoruba translation by Abimbola Alao. (2005) Mantra Lingua.
 My Talking Dictionary & Interactive CD ROM Yoruba & English – Yoruba translation by Abimbola Alao. (2005) Mantra Lingua.

References

External links
Abimbola Alao

World Stories - Yoruba

Living people
Yoruba women writers
Writers from Ibadan
Nigerian writers
Nigerian women educators
Nigerian emigrants to the United Kingdom
University of Ibadan alumni
Alumni of the University of Plymouth
Life coaches
21st-century Nigerian writers
21st-century Nigerian women writers
English–Yoruba translators
Year of birth missing (living people)
21st-century translators
Yoruba people
Yoruba writers